The 1931 Grand National was the 90th renewal of the Grand National horse race that took place at Aintree near Liverpool, England, on 27 March 1931.

The steeplechase was won by Grakle, at odds of 100/6. The nine-year-old was ridden by jockey Bob Lyall and trained by Tom Coulthwaite for owner Cecil Taylor, who collected the £9,310 prize.

Gregalach, winner in 1929, finished in second place; Annandale was third and Rhyticere fourth. Forty-three horses ran and all but two returned safely to the stables. Swift Roland was fatally injured at Becher's Brook when another faller landed on him, and Drin was euthanised after incurring a leg fracture at Valentine's Brook.

Finishing order

Non-finishers

References

 1931
Grand National
Grand National
20th century in Lancashire